is Japanese idol group AKB48's second single, released independently through AKS on June 7, 2006. The song was sung by 7 members of AKB48 Team A, Tomomi Itano, Haruna Kojima, Atsuko Maeda, Rina Nakanishi, Risa Narita, Mai Oshima, and Minami Takahashi, and other members of Team A were back dancers. The center of the song is Minami Takahashi and Atsuko Maeda.

Promotion
Launching of "Skirt, Hirari" was held at the off-theater live promoting event at Akihabara UDX with some 1,500 attendees on June 4, 2006, 3 days prior the release date. During this event, all AKB48 members, 20 members of Team A and 17 members of Team K, performed on the stage together first time, although "Skirt, Hirari" itself was recorded with Team A members only.

They made their first appearances on TV music programs to perform as a group of singers, such as "Music Station", "Music Fighter", etc. on June 9, two days after the release of CD.

The B-side "Aozora no soba ni ite" was used as the ending theme song for the variety show Mitake Uranai.

Each  CD included a postcard, which was for a lucky draw with following awards.
Award A - Participation right for 
Award K - Participation right for watching a rehearsal of "3rd Stage" with AKB48 staffs
Award B - AKB48 Team A "1st stage" DVD
Sticker with all AKB48 members
Sticker with self-portrait of members (1 out of 20 members)

'Because of some chance mischief, I happened to pass you
My heart nearly stopped
And I purposely pretended to ignore you as I walked by
How stupid am I?
When I like you so much
I fall into a pit of self-hate
Alone in the crowd at the station'

Reception
The single charted 6 weeks in the top 200 with the highest rank at #13, but sold 20,609 copies, which was about a half of their debut single, "Sakura no Hanabiratachi".

Track listing

Charts

Reported sales

Other versions

 The Thai idol group BNK48, an international sister group of AKB48, covered the song and named it "Phlio" ("Wavering"). It was released as a B-side track of the group's second single, "Koi Suru Fortune Cookie – Khukki Siangthai", in 2017.
The Filipino idol group MNL48, an international sister group of AKB48, covered the song with the tagalized title "Umiindak Na Saya". It was released as a B-side track for the group’s debut single “Aitakatta-Gustong Makita”, in 2018.
JKT48 also have an indonesian version of the song named "Rok Bergoyang"

References 

AKB48 songs
2006 singles
Songs with lyrics by Yasushi Akimoto
BNK48 songs
MNL48 songs